Cytaea nausori is a species of jumping spiders.

Name
The species is named after the area where the first specimen was collected.

Appearance
Cytaea nausori females are about 6 mm long, males slightly longer than 4 mm.

Distribution
Cytaea nausori is only known from Viti Levu in Fiji.

References

  (2007): The world spider catalog, version 8.0. American Museum of Natural History.

External links
 (1998): Salticidae of the Pacific Islands. III.  Distribution of Seven Genera, with Description of Nineteen New Species and Two New Genera. Journal of Arachnology 26(2): 149-189. PDF

Endemic fauna of Fiji
Spiders described in 1998
nausori
Spiders of Fiji